Pyridoxal 5′-phosphate synthase (glutamine hydrolysing) (EC 4.3.3.6, PdxST) is an enzyme with systematic name D-ribose 5-phosphate,D-glyceraldehyde 3-phosphate pyridoxal 5′-phosphate-lyase. This enzyme catalyses the following chemical reaction

 D-ribose 5-phosphate + D-glyceraldehyde 3-phosphate + L-glutamine  pyridoxal 5′-phosphate + L-glutamate + 3 H2O + phosphate (overall reaction)
(1a) L-glutamine + H2O  L-glutamate + NH3
(1b) D-ribose 5-phosphate + D-glyceraldehyde 3-phosphate + NH3  pyridoxal 5′-phosphate + 4 H2O + phosphate

The enzyme can also use ribulose 5-phosphate and dihydroxyacetone phosphate.

References

External links 
 

EC 4.3.3